Empress Khri ma lod (or Thrimalö) was an Empress regent of Tibet. She was Empress consort by marriage to emperor Mangsong Mangtsen. She was the ruler of the Tibetan empire twice: in 675-689 during the minority of her son emperor Tridu Songtsen, and in 704-712 during the minority of her grandson emperor Gyältsugru. Her title as regent was tsenmo (the female equivalent of tsenpo, the Tibetan title most frequently translated as emperor).

Life
Khri ma lod was married to emperor Mangsong Mangtsen (Trimang Löntsen''' or Khri-mang-slon-rtsan). The emperor died in the winter of 676-677, and in the same year she gave birth to the emperor's son Tridu Songtsen (Khri 'dus-srong btsan or Khri-'dus-srong-rtsan).

The Zhangzhung revolted early in her son's reign. She shared power with the Gar (Mgar) clan. When her son Tridu campaigned in the northeast 700-4 CE, she resumed her administrative regency at home.

Khri ma lod's grandson Gyältsugru (Rgyal-gtsug-ru) was born in 704 to her daughter-in-law Chimza Tsunmotog (mChims-bza' bTsan-ma Thog-thog-sten), Princess of Chim. Upon the death of Tridu Songtsen that year, his elder son Lha Balpo (Lha Bal-pho'') briefly succeeded him before Khri ma lod dethroned him at Pong Lag-rang in favor of the infant Gyältsugru.

Khri ma lod had arranged for a royal marriage of Gyältsugru to a Chinese princess. The Princess Jincheng (金城公主, Tibetan: Kyimshang Kongjo) arrived in 710, but it is somewhat unclear whether she married the seven-year-old Gyältsugru or the deposed Lha Balpo.

Khri ma lod died in 712. Gyältsugru was then officially enthroned with the royal name Tride Tsuktsän. Khri ma lod remains the only woman in Tibetan history to rule Tibet.

References

External links 
Worldwide Guide to Women in Leadership
The Historical Interaction between the Buddhist and Islamic Cultures before the Mongol Empire

712 deaths
7th-century Tibetan people
Tibetan empresses
Tibetan Buddhists
8th-century rulers in Asia
8th-century Tibetan people
Year of birth unknown
8th-century women rulers
7th-century women rulers